Nightmare Circus is a platform video game developed by Funcom and published by Tec Toy for the Mega Drive. The game was released in Brazil in 1996, and eventually in North America via the Sega Channel in December 1996. It was also released on the Sega Channel in the UK.

Plot
The story begins with a circus that was held out in the desert of Arizona. On opening night, the circus was burned completely to the ground by its shady and villainous operator, the Jester, who intended to cash in on an insurance policy. Afterwards, the Jester was convicted for the deaths of the fire victims. However, before he was executed, the Jester warned that the souls of his victims would be forever tormented. Many years later, a Native American named Raven, who had lost relatives in the fire, goes to investigate the location where the circus was held, and where supernatural events have been reported. Night comes, and suddenly there appears, via the psi-energy of the Jester, a ghostly apparition of the destroyed circus.

Gameplay
 In the game, Raven must go through multiple levels of the circus environment using various fighting moves to destroy enemies. The game has a normal one-player mode, but it also features a cooperative two-player mode, a one-on-one duel mode where a player can fight against a second player or an enemy character, and a mode where one player controls Raven and the second player controls the generation of the enemies in the game.

The game has a "Tweak" mode which allows a player to adjust numerous game variables such as the gravity, the speed of objects, and the appearance of enemies. The soundtrack was composed by Jim Hedges, Kurt Harland Larsen, and Andy Armer.

Reception
USA magazine Next Generation commented that the game had a lot more detail than many other platform games, but that its potential significance was reduced since the Sega Genesis was starting to be supplanted by other consoles. The game's intended North American release in late 1995 was indeed cancelled, though it later appeared in that region for the Sega Channel.

References

External links

Nightmare Circus information at Funcom (Archived)

1996 video games
Fiction set in circuses
Fictional jesters
Native Americans in popular culture
Video games about ghosts
Funcom games
Horror video games
Sega Genesis games
Sega Genesis-only games
Platform games
Video games based on Native American mythology
Video games developed in Norway
Video games scored by Andy Armer
Video games scored by Kurt Harland
Video games set in amusement parks
Video games set in Arizona
Multiplayer and single-player video games